Limax  is a genus of air-breathing land slugs in the terrestrial pulmonate gastropod mollusk family Limacidae.

The generic name Limax literally means "slug".

Some species, such as the leopard slug (L. maximus) and the tawny garden slug (Limacus flavus), are considered garden pests.

The genus Limax sensu stricto is probably monophyletic.<ref name=klee>Klee, B. 2006 [http://www.malacsoc.org.uk/The_Malacologist/BULL48/forum48.htm#phyl Towards a phylogeny of Limax (Gastropoda: Stylommatophora).]  The Malacologist. Molluscan Forum 2006.</ref>

 Distribution 
This genus is native to Europe, but at least one species (L. maximus) has been introduced into North America.

 Species 

The genus Limax includes at least 33 species:

 Limax aeolianus Giusti, 1973
 Limax albipes Dumont & Mortillet, 1853
 Limax amaliae Bettoni, 1870
 Limax bielzii Seibert, 1873
 Limax brandstetteri Falkner, 2008
 Limax camerani Lessona & Pollonera, 1882
 Limax canapicianus Pollonera, 1885
 Limax cephalonicus Simroth, 1886
 Limax ciminensis Pollonera, 1890
 Limax cinereoniger Wolf, 1803 (syn. Limax alpinus Férussac, 1822)
 Limax conemenosi Böttger, 1882
 Limax corsicus Moquin-Tandon, 1855
 Limax dacampi Menegazzi, 1854
 Limax dacampi dacampi Menegazzi, 1855
 Limax dobrogicus Grossu & Lupu, 1960Limax doriae  Bourguignat, 1861
 Limax engadinensis Heynemann, 1863
 Limax erythrus Bourguignat, 1864
 Limax gerhardti Niethammer, 1937
 Limax giovannellae Falkner & Niederhöfer, 2008
 Limax giustii Falkner & Nitz, 2010
 Limax graciadeii Gerhardt, 1940
 Limax graecus Simroth, 1889
 Limax granosus Bérenguier, 1900
 Limax hemmeni Rähle, 1983
 Limax ianninii Giusti, 1973
 Limax ilvensis Falkner & Nitz, 2010
 Limax lachensis Bérenguier, 1900
 Limax luctuosus  Moquin-Tandon, 1855
 Limax maximus Linnaeus, 1758 - great grey slug
 Limax millipunctatus Pini, 1885
 Limax monolineatus Bettoni, 1870
  Limax monregalensis Lessona & Pollonera, 1882
 Limax pironae Pini, 1876
 Limax polipunctatus Pollonera, 1888
 Limax punctulatus Sordelli, 1871
 Limax redii Gerhardt, 1933
 Limax samensis Heim & Nitz, 2009
 Limax squamosus Bérenguier, 1900
 Limax strobeli Pini, 1876
 Limax subalpinus Lessona, 1880
 Limax tschapecki Simroth, 1886
 Limax veronensis Lessona & Pollonera, 1882
 Limax vizzavonensis Falkner & Nitz, 2010
 Limax wohlberedti Simroth, 1900
 Limax wolterstorffi Simroth, 1900
 Limax zilchi Grossu & Lupu, 1960

 Subgenus Limacus (more often today treated as its own genus) 

 Limax ecarinatus Boettger, 1881: synonym of Limacus maculatus (Kaleniczenko, 1851)
 Limax flavus Linnaeus, 1758 yellow garden slug, tawny garden slug: synonym of Limacus flavus (Linnaeus, 1758)

 Synonyms 
 Limax marginatus Müller, 1774 is a synonym for Lehmannia marginata (Müller, 1774)
 Limax valentianus Férussac, 1822 is a synonym for Ambigolimax valentianus (Férussac, 1822)
 Limax nyctelius Bourguignat, 1861 is now placed in the genus Letourneuxia but the name has been used for Lehmannia carpatica (Bourguignat, 1861) and Ambigolimax waterstoni'' Hutchinson, Reise & Schlitt, 2022

References 

Limacidae
Gastropod genera
Agricultural pest molluscs
Taxa named by Carl Linnaeus